Boubacar Diarra (born 18 April 1994) is a Malian footballer who plays as a defensive midfielder for Horoya AC.

Club career
Diarra's career began in Mali with AS Revenant and AS Korofina, he then left his homeland to go to the DR Congo to join Linafoot team TP Mazembe. During his time with TP Mazembe, Diarra won the 2013 Linafoot, the 2013–14 Linafoot and the 2015 CAF Champions League. He departed in 2016 to join Tunisian Ligue Professionnelle 1 outfit Club Africain, making his debut in a defeat to Stade Tunisien on 17 February 2016. Six months and thirteen appearances later, Diarra was on the move again as he signed for Wadi Degla of the Egyptian Premier League. On 19 January 2017, Diarra completed a transfer to Wadi Degla's sister club Lierse.

He made his Lierse debut on 27 January in a league match against OH Leuven. In October 2018, Diarra joined Sudan Premier League side Al-Hilal Club. A move to Saudi Arabia and Najran of the Prince Mohammad bin Salman League occurred on 26 June 2019. However, in the succeeding September, Diarra headed to I-League club NEROCA; having terminated his Najran contract. He netted goals against Chennai City, East Bengal, TRAU and Real Kashmir across 2019–20.

International career
Diarra has represented Mali at U20, U23 and senior level. He won three caps for the U20s during the 2013 FIFA U-20 World Cup in Turkey. He made his senior debut on 29 June 2016 in a friendly against China at the Shenzhen Stadium.

Career statistics

Club
.

International
.

Honours
TP Mazembe
Linafoot (2): 2013, 2013–14
CAF Champions League: 2015

References

External links

1994 births
Living people
Sportspeople from Bamako
Malian footballers
Mali under-20 international footballers
Mali international footballers
Malian expatriate footballers
Expatriate footballers in the Democratic Republic of the Congo
Expatriate footballers in Tunisia
Expatriate footballers in Egypt
Expatriate footballers in Belgium
Expatriate footballers in Sudan
Expatriate footballers in Saudi Arabia
Expatriate footballers in India
Expatriate footballers in Guinea
Malian expatriate sportspeople in the Democratic Republic of the Congo
Malian expatriate sportspeople in Tunisia
Malian expatriate sportspeople in Egypt
Malian expatriate sportspeople in Belgium
Malian expatriate sportspeople in Sudan
Malian expatriate sportspeople in Saudi Arabia
Malian expatriate sportspeople in India
Association football midfielders
Tunisian Ligue Professionnelle 1 players
Egyptian Premier League players
Challenger Pro League players
I-League players
AS Korofina players
TP Mazembe players
Club Africain players
Wadi Degla SC players
Lierse S.K. players
Al-Hilal Club (Omdurman) players
Najran SC players
NEROCA FC players
Horoya AC players
21st-century Malian people